Otakar Kouba (24 October 1906 – January 1983) was a Czechoslovak canoeist who competed in the 1936 Summer Olympics.

He was born in Prague in October 1906. In 1936 he and his partner Ludvík Klíma finished fifth in the folding K-2 10000 m event.

Kouba died in January 1983, at the age of 76.

References

1906 births
1983 deaths
Canoeists at the 1936 Summer Olympics
Czechoslovak male canoeists
Olympic canoeists of Czechoslovakia
Canoeists from Prague